"Nightmare" is an episode of the original The Outer Limits television show. It first aired on 2 December 1963, during the first season.

Introduction
A group of space troopers are psychologically  tortured in an alien prisoner-of-war camp.

Opening narration

Plot
In response to an unprovoked nuclear attack from the planet Ebon, a group of soldiers–representing Unified Earth–is sent to fight the enemy on their alien world. Captured en route to Ebon, the soldiers undergo physical and psychological torture and interrogation at the hands of the Ebonites, who possess the ability to control physical abilities and senses. The prisoners become suspicious of each other when their captors claim they have received cooperation in obtaining military secrets, which is further complicated by each one's past and ethnic origins, along with the unexpected appearance of high-ranking Earth officers among the hostile aliens. The earthmen are subjected to various interactive images of relatives and friends, which have been implanted in their minds during questioning, allowing them to feel a false sense of security, or to instill deeply hidden emotional conflicts. In the end, it is revealed that all of this is but a military "game", organized by the Earth officers to test their troops' loyalty and valor under intense interrogation and psychological stress. The Earth-Ebon war itself is a fake, as the Ebonites' initial bombardment was unintentional. Unexpected accidents and deaths having occurred during the test, the Ebonites –who are, in actuality, a peaceful and honorable alien civilization– ultimately demand that such an immoral and inhuman experiment to end at once. Nevertheless they fail to prevent one last man from being killed, one of the conspiring Earth officers thought to be an illusion created by the Ebonites to trick the captives into revealing more information.

Closing narration

Original air date and reception
Originally scheduled to air on November 25, 1963, this episode was delayed until December 2 due to television coverage of the state funeral of President John F. Kennedy. When the episode did air (in December) it was one of the most watched television episodes aired at the time, and the most-watched  television broadcast of any show that week in every television media market in Maine, Wyoming, Alabama, South Carolina and Tennessee as well as in every media market in Georgia outside of Atlanta. Science Fiction writers Harlan Ellison and Robert A. Heinlein both said they believed it was the best episode of the original season of Outer Limits.

Cast

References

External links
 "Nightmare" appreciation by David C. Holcomb

The Outer Limits (1963 TV series season 1) episodes
1963 American television episodes
Television episodes written by Joseph Stefano
Television episodes about space warfare